Hills and Dales may refer to:

Hills and Dales, Kentucky
Hills and Dales, Ohio
Hills and Dales, Tennessee
Holaday Hills and Dales, a neighborhood of Carmel, Indiana
Hill 'n Dale, Florida
Hill N Dale, Lexington
Hills and Dales Estate

See also
Hill and dale